Jawahar Navodaya Vidyalaya, Mahe is a co-educational boarding school in Mahe district of Puducherry union territory in India. Navodaya Vidyalayas are funded by the Government of India's Ministry of Education and administered by Navodaya Vidyalaya Samiti, an autonomous body under the ministry. Navodaya Vidyalayas offer free education to children from Class VI to XII. Mahe district is a coastal enclave within Kerala state, located about 615 km from union territory headquarter Pondicherry.

History 
The school was established in 1988, and is a part of Jawahar Navodaya Vidyalaya schools. This school is administered and monitored by Hyderabad regional office of Navodaya Vidyalaya Samiti.

Admission 

Students are admitted to the sixth Standard through Jawahar Navodaya Vidyalaya Selection Test (JNVST). Only those students who are currently studying in fifth standard in Government/Aided Schools and Government Recognized Schools are eligible to apply for the test. Another test called Lateral Entry Selection Test (LEST) for admissions to ninth standard is also conducted by the CBSE to accommodate students who wish to join Navodaya Schools, subject to the availability of vacant seats in ninth standard. Lateral Entry is also made for class eleventh admissions. The information about test is disseminated and advertised in district by the office of the Regional Administrator of Mahe, who is also the chairperson of Vidyalya Management Committee of JNV Mahe.

Affiliations 
JNV Mahe is affiliated to Central Board of Secondary Education with affiliation number 2940003.

See also 

 Jawahar Navodaya Vidyalaya, Puducherry
 Jawahar Navodaya Vidyalaya, Karaikal
 Jawahar Navodaya Vidyalaya, Yanam
 List of JNV schools

References

External links 

 Official Website of JNV Mahe

High schools and secondary schools in Puducherry
Mahe
Educational institutions established in 1988
1988 establishments in Pondicherry
Mahe district